This is a list of grounds that Kent County Cricket Club have used since the formation of the first county club in August 1842. The club has used 29 grounds for first-class, List A and Twenty20 home matches. Prior to the formation of the first county club an informal county team had appeared in first-class matches from 1773 and cricket had been played in the county from at least the 17th century.

White Hart Field in Bromley played host to the club's first home fixture in first-class cricket against an All England cricket team in 1842. The county was based at the Beverley Ground in Canterbury until 1846 and Canterbury Cricket Week was first established at this ground. From 1847 the base for the county moved to the St Lawrence Ground, also in Canterbury, and this ground was later established as the county's formal headquarters. It is now the main ground for the county and hosts the majority of home matches, although it was typically only used for county cricket during Canterbury week until well into the 20th century. The ground is famous for having had a tree, the St Lawrence Lime, on the playing area for most of its history.

Unusually for a first-class county, Kent have played over 100 home fixtures at seven grounds and continued to play the majority of its matches away from the St Lawrence Ground until well into the 20th century. The out-grounds still in use as of 2018 are the Nevill Ground in Tunbridge Wells, which hosts the annual Tunbridge Wells Cricket Week, and the County Cricket Ground, Beckenham.

The 29 grounds that Kent have used for home matches since 1842 are listed below along with The Oval in London, which is the home ground of Surrey County Cricket Club which was used for two home matches by Kent.

Grounds
Below is a list of grounds used by Kent County Cricket Club in first-class, List A and Twenty20 matches. Grounds are listed in order of their first use by the county. The count only includes matches where Kent were the home team. Many grounds have been used by other teams, including for international matches.

The Oval
Kent have used The Oval, the home ground of Surrey County Cricket Club, for "home" matches on two occasions. The quarter-final of the 1981 Benson & Hedges Cup against Warwickshire was scheduled to be played on the St Lawrence Ground but, following heavy rain, the ground was deemed unplayable. Play was impossible on the first two days allocated for the fixture and an inspection on the third day also ruled out play and the match was switched to use The Oval at short notice.

The second Kent "home" match on the ground was a 2010 Twenty20 Cup fixture against Essex which Kent chose to play on the ground in an attempt to increase attendance and, as a result, income. The experiment was not repeated.

Notes

References

Bibliography
Milton H (2020) Kent County Cricket Grounds. Woking: Pitch Publishing. 

Kent County Cricket Club
Cricket grounds in Kent
Kent
Kent-related lists